Lawrence Hartmann is a child and adult psychiatrist, social-psychiatric activist, and former President of the American Psychiatric Association (APA). Hartmann played a central role in the APA's 1973 decision to remove homosexuality as a diagnosis of mental illness from its Diagnostic and Statistical Manual. This change decisively changed the modern era of LGBTQ rights by providing support for the overturning of laws and prejudices against homosexuals and by advancing gay civil rights, including the right to immigrate, to adopt, to buy a home, to teach,  to marry, and to be left alone.

Family and  early life 
Hartmann grew up in New York City.  He was born in Vienna, Austria in 1937 into a prominent family of intellectuals, professors, and social reformers. Hartmann's early years were unsettled by the annexation of Austria by Nazi Germany (Anschluss), and his family's consequent emigration from Vienna to Paris in 1938, to Switzerland in 1939, and to New York City in 1941. His father was Heinz Hartmann (1894–1970), an internationally known psychiatrist and psychoanalyst, as well as a student and analysand of Sigmund Freud's. HH became widely known as an ego-psychologist and something of a dean of world psychoanalysis in the mid-twentieth century. LH's  mother, Dora (Karplus) Hartmann,. (1902–1974), came from a family of lawyers and publishers. A noted mountaineer in her early life, she chose to become a pediatrician in Vienna (over the objections of her usually supportive lawyer father, who believed that a woman's constitution was not strong enough to endure medical school). She continued her medical training in New York to become a psychiatrist and psychoanalyst.

Education and academic and clinical career
Hartmann was educated at the Fieldston School in New York City and then at Harvard College, where he received a B.A. in History and Literature (magna cum laude, Phi Beta Kappa). As a Rhodes Scholar, Hartmann earned two degrees in English Literature from Oxford University. He received an M.D. from Harvard Medical School and then served as an intern in pediatrics at the University of California in San Francisco. He served his residency in psychiatry (1965–1967) and a fellowship in child psychiatry (1967–1969) at the Massachusetts Mental Health Center (MMHC), a Harvard Teaching Hospital. He was psychoanalyzed from 1966 until 1971. Upon completion of his training, Hartmann began a private practice with adults, adolescents, and children ; ran a child and adolescent psychiatry clinic and a school consultation program; and, for about 50 years, taught,  and served as a clinical professor of psychiatry, at Harvard Medical School , mostly at MMHC and later mostly at Cambridge Hospital. He has written on such topics as child psychotherapy, dirty words, ethics, apartheid, torture, skepticism, and biopsychosocial integration.

Public career 
Following the U.S. invasion of Cambodia and the Kent State Shootings in 1970, Hartmann co-founded and co-chaired the Committee For Concerned Psychiatrists within the American Psychiatric Association with  goals including persuading the APA to “acknowledge and take part in social issues that affect mental health and mental illness.” The CFCP  expanded its central focus on APA structure and leadership somewhat also into  social issues, including not just the Vietnam War but also Civil Rights,  Women's Rights , Children's Rights , and Minority Rights , including Gay and Lesbian Rights.

Finding the governing structure of the APA deeply conservative and self-perpetuating, Hartmann re-wrote some APA By-Laws, which changes the APA membership repeatedly passed, and, with several CFCP friends and colleagues, and much support from APA members, found and encouraged and nominated distinguished reform-minded candidates to run for leadership positions.  Candidates nominated and boosted by the CFCP included Alfred Friedman (1917–2011) who served as APA president in 1973–1974 and John Spiegel (1911–1991) who served as APA president in 1974–1975;  as well as Judd Marmor, Jack Weinberg, Viola Bernard,  Mildred Nitchell-Bateman, and Alan Stone. These leaders mostly shared or came to share the CFCP's belief that public laws against homosexuality and prohibitions against homosexuals in psychiatry were based upon flawed studies, societal prejudice, and outdated psychoanalytic theory. Hartmann and the CFCP also participated in the APA's selection of Melvin Sabshin (1925–2011), a distinguished psychiatrist, dean,  and social reformer who favored broader membership participation in the APA, and who went on to serve as the organization's Medical Director from 1974 until 1997.

Locally, leading the Social Issues Committee of the Northern New England Psychiatric Society (NNEPS), in 1972 Hartmann asked Richard Pillard (b.1933) a researcher who had just become one of the country's extremely rare psychiatrists to identify himself publicly as gay, to help him draft a position paper for the NNEPS Social Issues Committee arguing that homosexuality did not meet the scientific or clinical criteria for a diagnosis of mental illness, and that homosexuals deserved full civil rights. With minor modification, this paper was adopted by the NNEPS , then by the APA Assembly's Area I Council, and then , with further persuasion from NNEPS,  by the usually conservative Assembly of District Branches of the APA , which passed the position paper and sent it on to the APA Board of Trustees, where it joined a parallel widely considered and debated paper from the APA Council and Committee system (Committee on Nomenclature, Council on Research, Reference Committee). In December 1973, the Board of Trustees of the APA voted 13–0,  that homosexuality was not valid as a diagnosis of mental illness, and that discrimination against homosexuals should stop. That was now APA policy, and turned out to be widely influential. The next year, a small group of prominent opponents attempted to reverse the Board's vote by referendum, but that reversal effort failed .  The APA's membership affirmed the removal of homosexuality as a diagnosis of mental illness.

Hartmann's activism and interest in complex psychiatic issues and biopsychosocial integration  led him to be elected a member of the APA Assembly and subsequently Speaker of the Assembly before being elected Area Trustee, Vice President (1990) and then President of the APA (1991–1992).

Hartmann was active in several other psychiatric associations, and over several decades served on many APA components , e.g. the APA Council on Children, The Council on Education, The Council on International Affairs, The Reference Committee, The Ethics Committee,The Constition-and-Bylaws Committee, The Budget Committee,  The Human Rights Committee, and numerous other APA and APA Assembly committees, as well as being a founding director of the precursor of the American Psychiatric Foundation.. He was also a founding director of the publishing house APPI, later called American Psychiatric Publishing, Inc.     As an APA Board member , and some time Chair of the Council on International Affairs , Hartmann helped international understanding and visitation at many levels, served as a visiting Professor of Psychiatry in Saudi Arabia, and led and participated in human rights missions to examine mental health conditions and services and omissions in The Union Of South Africa under Apartheid , and also in Chile, under the  dictatorship of  Pinochet. Advised by Melvin Sabshin and others,  Hartmann traveled to the Soviet Union to meet with dissident psychiatrists and to examine evidence of the abuse of psychiatry, and the end of that abuse, by the Soviet government. Hartmann's findings contributed to the successful efforts of Melvin Sabshin and the British Psychiatric group (RCP) and the APA to persuade the World Psychiatric Association (WPA) to establish Ethics standards and an Ethics Committee, which would investigate abuses of psychiatry. The Soviet Union resigned from the WPA in protest, and changed its mental health laws.  In 1988, Hartmann also co-chaired a  joint scientific meeting of the APA and the Chinese Medical Association, in Beijing .    In 1991 and 1992, Hartmann helped form, and then led, a distinguished group of American psychiatric  teachers and researchers who made up a Traveling University of Psychiatry that went to post-Iron-Curtain Poland, Czechoslovakia, and Hungary in 1992.

In 1996, Hartmann co-founded the Committee on Sexual Orientation and Gender Identity of the Boston Psychoanalytic Institute (BPSI) with Gerald Adler, M.D. a psychoanalyst friend who was at the time  the President of BPSI. This work was part of a broader effort that resulted in psychoanalytic education and policy changes and  the American Psychoanalytic Association's issuing a public apology to the LGBTQ community  for its past views that had pathologized homosexuality and transgender identities. In 2019, BPSI awarded Honorary Membership to Hartmann, citing his role in the APA's 1973 vote and his contribution to psychoanalysis by helping “to remove homophobia from our institutional culture by organizing conferences, leading evening programs, serving as a discussant during clinical presentations, leading a long-term BPSI committee, and welcoming and providing mentorship for gay analytic Candidates when little or none existed.”

Personal life 
Hartmann has lived with Brian Pfeiffer, an architectural historian, in Cambridge, Massachusetts since 1973. They married in 2004 when Massachusetts became the first state in the nation to grant full civil rights for same-sex marriage.

Selected bibliography 
 
 
 Hartmann, L. & Hanson, G. (1986), Child psychotherapy. In: Current Psychiatric Therapies, ed. J. Masserman. New York: Grune and Stratton, pp. 29–43.
 
 
 {Hartmann, L. (1992a), Some social psychiatric problems in Chile, South Africa and the Soviet Union. In: Psychiatry and World Accords, ed. J. Masserman. New York, Gardner, pp. 5–15.
 
 
 Hanson, G. & Hartmann, L. (1996), Latency development in prehomosexual boys. In: Textbook of Homosexuality and Mental Health, ed. R.P. Cabaj & T.S. Stein. Washington, DC: American Psychiatric Press, pp. 253–266.
Hartmann, L. (1996), Foreword. In: Textbook of Homosexuality and Mental Health, ed. R.P. Cabaj & T.S. Stein. Washington, DC: American Psychiatric Press, pp. xxv–xxxi.
  
 
 
 Hartmann, L. (2001), "Confidentiality". In Ethics Primer of the American Psychiatric Association, ed. D. Langsley. Washington, DC: American Psychiatric Press, pp. 39–45.

References

Additional references 
 American Psychoanalytic Association. Press Release: APsaA Issues Overdue Apology to LGBTQ Community. June 21, 2019. https://apsa.org/content/news-apsaa-issues-overdue-apology-lgbtq-community
 American Academy of Child and Adolescent Psychiatry, Lawrence Hartmann, M.D., Life Member’s Report, June, 2012. https://www.aacap.org/aacap/Life_Members/Reports/2012/Hartmann_201206.aspx
 Bayer, R. Homosexuality and American Psychiatry: The Politics of Diagnosis. New York: Basic Books; New York, NY, USA: 1981.
 Drescher, J. and J. P. Merlino, ed. American psychiatry and Homosexuality: An Oral History. Chapter 3: An Interview with Lawrence Hartmann, MD. Routledge: 2007.
 Drescher J., Merlino J.P., editors. American Psychiatry and Homosexuality: An Oral History. Routledge; New York, NY, USA: 2007.
 Levin, Aaron. Global Initiative on Psychiatry.  Psychiatric News, Vol. 48, Issue 3, p 12. https://psychnews.psychiatryonline.org/doi/pdf/10.1176/pn.2013.48.issue-3
 Spiegel, Alix. 81 Words: The Story of how the American Psychiatric Association decided in 1973 that homosexuality was no longer a mental illness. This American Life, 204: January 18, 2002. https://www.thisamericanlife.org/204/81-words

1937 births
Living people
Alumni of the University of Oxford
Harvard College alumni
Harvard Medical School alumni
Presidents of the American Psychiatric Association